Inguilpata is a district in the Luya Province, Perú. Inguilpata is located in the high mountains, it offers several attractive places for tourists such as the  ruins of the Chachapoya culture as well as a large variety of crafts are available.

Districts of the Luya Province
Districts of the Amazonas Region